The Verificationist is a 2000 novel by American author Donald Antrim. The novel follows the conversations, fantasies, and the emotionally dissociated states of a group of psychoanalysts gathered during a nocturnal pancake supper.  The narrator’s predilection for starting food fights and instigating mayhem leads Bernhardt, the most grotesque and overbearing from among his colleagues, to hold him around his midsection almost for the duration of the novel while the narrator (named 'Tom') hallucinates himself hovering over the crowd.   The New York Times called it, "A Freudian free-for-all," and George Saunders hailed it as, "one of the most pleasure-giving, perverse, complicated, and addictive novels in the past 20 years," in his article for Salon, which later became the book's introduction.

Plot summary 

The Verificationist is set in early spring in an undisclosed New England city, at a pancake house where Tom—the novel's protagonist—has called together his fellow psychologists from the Krakower Institute for their biannual pancake supper.  The conversations amongst the psychotherapists at these biannual pancake dinners are generally dedicated to “the seemingly everlasting task of reconciling classical metapsychology to our particular branch of Self/Other Friction Theory.”    The narrative may be divided into three levels: what is happening in the diner, what is happening in Tom's "transient psychotic state", and what he imagines his wife, Jane, is doing at home.

In the diner, the insecurities and neuroses of the psychotherapists in attendance are on display in their conversations, as interpreted by the relentlessly psychoanalyzing voice of the narrator.  Tom attempts to start a food-fight, and the "patriarchal" Bernhardt lifts him into air, gripping him in a bear-hug. When Berhardt lifts Tom into the air, Tom experiences a sudden dissociative state, in which he imagines himself floating along the ceiling of the restaurant. Tom remains in this suspended state for the remainder of the novel.

In Tom's "transient psychotic state" he is floating on the ceiling, with the obese Bernhardt trailing along behind him as a silent, psychologically symbolic patriarch.  As the evening progresses, more of the characters join Tom and Bernhardt's hallucinatory flotilla: the waitress, the alcoholic Psychoanalyst Sherwin Lang, and the postdoctoral student who is in love with Lang.  The question as to whether the hallucination Tom is having is a collective hallucination, shared by the other psychoanalysts, remains ambiguous throughout the narrative.

Tom imagines his wife, Jane, (who is at home throughout the novel's action) committing various infidelities.  Tom imagines Jane having a variety of sexual experiences both with himself and with other men.  The difficult subject of their childlessness is a theme in his fantasies.

Style

The style Antrim deployed in his trilogy (of which The Verificationist is the concluding volume)  is a mode of surrealism which resembles both magical realism and hysterical realism.  The Verificationist's diction, in particular, may be characterized as being replete with the kind of psychoanalytic jargon that is the natural idiom of the book's psychoanalytic narrator, Tom.

The Title

It is unclear why Antrim chose to title this work The Verificationist as there is no clear link between the attitudes of the narrator and the philosophical movement from the early 20th century known as Verificationism.

References

American magic realism novels
Postmodern novels